The 2017 U-18 Baseball World Cup or the XXVIII U-18 Baseball World Cup was an international baseball tournament held by the World Baseball Softball Confederation for players 18-year-old and younger. The 2017 edition was held in Thunder Bay, Canada from September 1–10, 2017.

Format
First round: The twelve participating nations were drawn into two groups of 6, in which single round robin will occur. The top 3 nations from each group advances to the Super Round, while the bottom 3 nations from each group advance to the consolation round.

Consolation round: The 6 nations in this round play one game against the teams they have not played yet. (example: The 4th placed team from Group A will play the bottom three teams from Group B)

Super round: The format in the Super Round is similar to that of the consolation round. Each team plays the top three teams from the opposing group. (example: The 1st placed team from Group B will play the top three teams from Group A) The standings for this round will include the 2 games played against the 2 other Second Round qualifiers from the team's First Round group, and the 3 games played in the second round, for a total of 5 games. The 3rd and 4th place finishers advance to the Bronze Medal Game, and the 1st and 2nd place finishers advance to the Gold Medal Game.

Finals: The Finals consist of the Bronze Medal Game, contested by the 3rd and 4th place finishers, and the Gold Medal Game, contested by the 1st and 2nd place finishers.

Teams
The following 12 teams qualified for the tournament. The number shown in parenthesis is the country's position in the WBSC World Rankings going into the competition.

 
 Chinese Taipei is the official WBSC designation for the team representing the state officially referred to as the Republic of China, more commonly known as Taiwan. (See also political status of Taiwan for details.)

First round

Group A

|}

Group B

|}

Super round

|}

consolation round

|}

Finals

Third place game

|}

Championship

|}

Medalists

Final standings

U-18 All-World Team

Statistics leaders

Batting

* Minimum 2.7 plate appearances per game

Pitching

* Minimum 0.8 innings pitched per game
** They are tied with others with a 0.00 ERA but they pitched the most innings (12.0)

References

External links
Event Official Website
Event Official Website at WBSC

U-18 Baseball World Cup
U-18 Baseball World Cup
Sport in Thunder Bay